Alf Teichs (1904–1992) was a German screenwriter and film producer. During the Nazi era, Teichs was head of production at Terra Film. After the Second World War, Teichs set up Comedia-Film with the comedian Heinz Rühmann.

Selected filmography

Producer 
 Comrades at Sea (1938)
 Alarm at Station III (1939)
 Roses in Tyrol (1940)
 Doctor Crippen (1942)
 Circus Renz (1943)
 Die Fledermaus (1946)
 Martina (1949)
 Spy for Germany (1956)
 Winter in the Woods (1956)
 Devil in Silk (1956)
 Jons und Erdme (1959)
 Stalingrad (1959)
 The High Life (1960)
 I'm Marrying the Director (1960)
 The Cry of the Wild Geese (1961)

Screenwriter
 Paul and Pauline (1936)
 Stjenka Rasin (1936)
 Target in the Clouds (1939)
 Midsummer Night's Fire (1939)
 The Murder Trial of Doctor Jordan (1949)
 Guitars of Love (1954)
 A Heart Full of Music (1955)
 The First Day of Spring (1956)

References

Bibliography 
 Bock, Hans-Michael & Bergfelder, Tim. The Concise CineGraph. Encyclopedia of German Cinema. Berghahn Books, 2009.

External links 
 

1904 births
1992 deaths
Film people from Dresden